The True Story of Jesse James is a 1957 American Western drama film adapted from Henry King's 1939 film Jesse James, which was only loosely based on James' life. It was directed by Nicholas Ray, with Robert Wagner portraying Jesse James and Jeffrey Hunter starring as Frank James. Filming took place during 1955.  Originally titled The James Brothers in the United Kingdom, the film focused on the relationship between the two James brothers during the last 18 years of Jesse James' life.

Plot
Jesse and Frank James ride with their gang into Northfield, Minnesota for a raid. While robbing a bank, gun fighting breaks out and two of the gang are killed. The James brothers and another gang member head out of town and hide out while investigators from the Remington Detective Agency search for James to receive a $30,000 reward. While the three are hiding, the film tells the story of how the James brothers came to be criminals in flashback.

Cast
Robert Wagner as Jesse James
Jeffrey Hunter as Frank James
Hope Lange as Zerelda "Zee" James, wife of Jesse
Agnes Moorehead as Zerelda Cole James, mother of the James brothers
Alan Hale, Jr. as Cole Younger
John Carradine as Rev. Jethro Bailey
Biff Elliot as Jim Younger 
Frank Gorshin as Charley Ford 
Carl Thayler as Robby Ford
Adam Marshall as Dick Liddell 
Anthony Ray as Bob Younger 
Louis Zito as Clell Miller
 Paul Wexler as Jayhawker
Clegg Hoyt as Tucker (uncredited)
Frank Overton as Maj. Rufus Cobb

Production
Shortly after his success with 1955's Rebel Without a Cause, Ray was hired to direct this movie based on Jesse James' later life. He had only one movie left under his contract with 20th Century Fox, before he would depart for Europe and film Bitter Victory. The studio suggested a remake of King's 1939 biography of Jesse James.

It is speculated that had James Dean not died in a car crash before production began, he would have starred in this film as Jesse James. In place of Dean, director Ray hoped to cast Elvis Presley, who had successfully completed his first film, Love Me Tender. Ray's son Tony also was cast in the film as Bob Younger, the first time he appeared in one of his father's films.

Hope Lange, a contract player for 20th Century Fox, was hired for the role of Jesse's wife after her Academy Award-nominated success with Peyton Place. John Carradine had appeared in the first Jesse James film as Bob Ford and appears in the 1957 version as Rev. Jethro Bailey.

Ray shot the film using CinemaScope, a new technology at that time. The movie was shot in 1956. Stock footage that had previously been used on the earlier James film which inspired this one was re-used and reconfigured for CinemaScope.

Characterizations
In the film, Jesse James is portrayed as a "Nicholas Ray hero"—a consistent type of character seen throughout Ray's films and thought to be based on Ray himself. Ray's similar characters include Jim Stark (James Dean) in Rebel Without a Cause and Jesus Christ in King of Kings.

Comic book adaptation
 Dell Four Color #757 (March 1957)

See also
 List of American films of 1957
 The Assassination of Jesse James by the Coward Robert Ford

References

External links
 

1957 films
1957 Western (genre) films
1950s biographical drama films
American Western (genre) films
American biographical drama films
Remakes of American films
Biographical films about Jesse James
Films directed by Nicholas Ray
Films set in Minnesota
Films adapted into comics
Films about bank robbery
Films with screenplays by Walter Newman (screenwriter)
Films scored by Leigh Harline
20th Century Fox films
1957 drama films
CinemaScope films
Revisionist Western (genre) films
1950s English-language films
1950s American films